Bucksville is an unincorporated community in Nockamixon Township in Bucks County, Pennsylvania, United States. Bucksville is located at the intersection of Pennsylvania Route 412 and Park Drive.

References

Unincorporated communities in Bucks County, Pennsylvania
Unincorporated communities in Pennsylvania